popcorn 

The following outline is provided as an overview of and topical guide to crafts:

Craft – skill, involving in many cases but not always, practical arts. It may refer to a trade or particular art. Crafts as artistic practices are defined either by their relationship to functional or utilitarian products, such as sculptural forms in the vessel tradition, or by their use of such natural media as wood, clay, glass, textiles, and metal.

What are crafts? 

A craft is a work of physical expression drawn from imagination or existing culture, largely by using hands. A craft is typically birthed by creativity and intentional design, through the application of skill(s)/ techniques and can extend across a wide range of areas from dance, embroidery to photography. Good 'craftsmanship' is marked by dexterity and experience.

Crafts as a whole can be described as all of the following:

 One of the arts – as an art form, crafts are an outlet of human expression, usually influenced by culture and which in turn help to change culture. Crafts are a physical manifestation of the internal human creative impulse and typically involves the use of hands to create the artform.
 One of the visual arts – visual arts is a class of art forms, including painting, sculpture, photography, printmaking and others, that focus on the creation of works which are primarily visual in nature.

Types of crafts

Ceramics and glass crafts
Ceramics and ceramic arts include:

Azulejo
Cameo glass
Earthenware
Glass and glass art
Bubblegram
Glass beadmaking
Glass etching
Glassblowing
Glassmaking
Stained glass and lead came and copper foil glasswork
Glassware
Mosaic
Porcelain
Bone china
Pottery
Stoneware

Fibre and textile crafts
See also Needlework below
 Bobbin lace
 Felting
 Knotting
 Chinese knotting
 Macramé
 Rope-making
 Rug making
 Spinning
 Stitch
 Tatting
 Weaving

Flower crafts
 Bouquet 
 Floral Design
 Ikebana

Leatherwork
 Boiled leather making
 Leather carving 
 Leather crafting (including dyeing, painting, and stamping)

Houseware 
 Basket weaving (also called basketry, basket making)
 Cooper

Fashion
Cloth
Dyeing and Printing
Batik 
Jewelry
 Beadwork

Needlework
 Applique 
 Crochet 
 Embroidery 
 Canvas work
 Bargello
 Berlin wool work
 Needlepoint
 Counted-thread
 Blackwork
 Cross-stitch
Whitework
 Surface embroidery
 Brazilian embroidery
Candlewicking
Couching
 Crewel embroidery
 Goldwork
 Ribbon embroidery
 Sashiko
 Stumpwork 
 Knitting 
 Nålebinding 
 Needlelace
 Patchwork 
 Quilting
 Broderie perse
 English paper piecing
 Trapunto
 Sewing
 Spool knitting

Paper crafts
Paper crafts include:

 Bookbinding
 Calligraphy
 Cast paper
 Decoupage
 Iris folding
 Origami (paper folding)
 Paper embossing
 Paper marbling
 Paper model
 Papercutting
 Papermaking
 Papier-mâche
 Parchment craft
 Quilling
 Scrapbooking

Wood and furniture crafts
 Cabinet making
 Carpentry
 Intarsia
 Lacquer art
 Marquetry
 Spoon carving
 Timber framing
 Upholstery
 Wood burning
 Wood carving
 Woodturning
 Woodworking
 Green woodworking

Stone crafts
 Flintknapping 
 Letter carving on stone.
 Mosaics and inlaying
 Stone carving
 Stonemasonry

Metal crafts
 Blacksmithing
 Casting
 Clockmaking
Cloisonné
 Coppersmith
 Enamelling
 Farrier
 Jewellery
 Goldsmith
 Lapidary
 Knife making
 Locksmithing
 Metalworking - metalsmith
 Pewter
 Silversmith
 Tinware - tinsmith
 Watchmaking
 Weaponsmith - sword making, armorer, gunsmith, fletching

General crafts concepts 
 American craft
 Artisan 
 Arts and crafts 
 Handicraft 
 Master craftsman 
Sloyd
Studio craft
 Studio pottery

See also 
Rural crafts
Stagecraft

References

External links

American Craft Council
Museum of Arts and Design

 
Crafts
Crafts